The Collected Stories of Katherine Anne Porter is a volume of her previously published collections of fiction and four uncollected works of short fiction.

Published in 1965 by Harcourt, Brace & World, the volume includes 26 works of fiction—all the stories that Porter "ever finished and published" in her lifetime.
The Collected Works of Katherine Anne Porter won the Pulitzer Prize for Fiction and the National Book Award for Fiction.

Stories

The Collected Stories of Katherine Anne Porter comprises the works of three earlier volumes —Flowering Judas and Other Stories (1935), Pale Horse, Pale Rider: Three Short Novels (1939) and The Leaning Tower and Other Stories (1944).—and four previously uncollected short stories: "Virgin Violeta" , "The Martyr", "The Fig Tree" and "Holiday."
The collection includes a brief preface penned by Porter especially for the publication, entitled "Go Little Book."

Preface 
 "Go Little Book"

From Flowering Judas and Other Stories (1935) 

 "María Concepción" 
 "Magic"
 "Rope"
 "He"
 "Theft"
 "That Tree"
 "The Jilting of Granny Weatherall"
 "Flowering Judas"
 "The Cracked Looking-Glass"
 "Hacienda"

From Pale Horse, Pale Rider (1939) 

 "Old Morality"
 "Noon Wine"
 "Pale Horse, Pale Rider"

From The Leaning Tower and Other Stories (1944) 

 "The Source"
 "The Witness"
 "The Circus"
 "The Journey"
 "The Last Leaf"
 "The Grave"
 "The Downward Path to Wisdom"
 "A Day's Work"
 "The Leaning Tower"

Uncollected stories 
 "Virgin Violeta" (The Century Magazine, December 1924)
 "The Martyr" (The Century Magazine, July 1923)
 "The "Fig Tree" (Harper's Magazine, June 1960)
 "Holiday" (Atlantic Monthly, December 1960)

Critical assessment
Biographer Darlene Harbour Unrue traces the evolution in the critical appraisal of Porter's oeuvre:

Literary critic for The New York Times, Howard Moss comments on the relationship between Porter's style and her subject matter:

Moss adds that "Miss Porter is a poet of the short story, and she never confuses the issue."

Footnotes

Sources 
Bloom, Harold. 2001. Katherine Anne Porter: Comprehensive Research and Study Guide. Chelsea House Publishers, Broomall, PA. 
Moss, Howard. 1965. The Collected Stories: A Poet of the Story in Critical Essays on Katherine Anne Porter Critical Essays on Katherine Anne Porter (1997). Editor, Darlene Harbour Unrue. G. K. Hall and Company, New York. 
Porter, Katherine Anne. 2009. Katherine Anne Porter: Collected Stories and Other Writings. Literary Classics of the United States, New York. The Library of America Series (2009). 
Unrue, Darlene Harbour. 1997. Critical Essays on Katherine Anne Porter. Editor, Darlene Harbour Unrue. G. K. Hall and Company, New York.

External links
 Photos of the first edition of The Collected Stories of Katherine Anne Porter

1962 short story collections
American short story collections
Harcourt (publisher) books
National Book Award for Fiction winning works
Pulitzer Prize for Fiction-winning works